Tassel Hill is a mountain located in the Central New York Region southwest of Clayville, New York. Tassel Hill is the highest point in Oneida County and it is ranked 38 of 62 on the list of New York County High Points.

References

Mountains of Oneida County, New York
Mountains of New York (state)